David K. Muradian Jr. (born November 21, 1982 in Blackstone Valley) is an American politician, who currently services as a  member of the Massachusetts House of Representatives.

Early life and education
Muradian was born and raised in the Blackstone Valley of Massachusetts. He attended Sutton High School, and played on their baseball and basketball teams. In 2005, Muradian received a Bachelor of Arts from Worcester State University, where he majored in communications and minored in history.

Political career
In 2007, Muradian began his career as a legislative aide to George N. Peterson Jr. until 2014. On January 7, 2015, Muradian was elected to succeed Peterson to represent the Massachusetts House of Representatives' 9th Worcester district, and was reelected on November 3, 2020. His current term is scheduled to end on January 4, 2023.

Muradian serves on several committees for the Commonwealth of Massachusetts including: Economic Development and Emerging Technologies; Global Warming and Climate Change; Housing; and Operations, Facilities, and Security.

Personal life
Muradian resides with his wife, Jessica Lynn, in Grafton, Massachusetts.

See also
 2019–2020 Massachusetts legislature
 2021–2022 Massachusetts legislature

References

External links
Commonwealth of Massachusetts profile
Official Twitter page

Living people
1982 births
People from Sutton, Massachusetts
People from Grafton, Massachusetts
Worcester State University alumni
American people of Armenian descent
Republican Party members of the Massachusetts House of Representatives
21st-century American politicians